The Key Man is a 2011 American crime thriller film written and directed by Peter Himmelstein and starring Jack Davenport, Hugo Weaving and Brian Cox.

Plot
A previously successful, but currently down on his luck, thirty-something insurance salesman is targeted by an aging gangster and his sociopathic Shakespearean actor/business partner. The salesman is lured into an illegal insurance deal with the promise of cash that will enable him to buy a new house for his family. Of course the deal goes sideways and violence ensues.

Cast
Hugo Weaving as Vincent
Brian Cox as Irving
Jack Davenport as Bobby
Judy Greer as Karen
Ben Shenkman as Martin

References

External links

2011 crime thriller films
American crime thriller films
Films scored by Terence Blanchard
Films produced by Keith Calder
2010s English-language films
2010s American films